Dhampus is a village and Village Development Committee  in Kaski District in the Gandaki Zone of northern-central Nepal. At the time of the 1991 Nepal census it had a population of 2,753 persons living in 547 individual households. It is gradually turning into a tourist destination. It has the Australian Base Camp with views of the peaks Annapurna, Dhaulagiri And Machhapuchhre.

Gallery

References

External links
UN map of the municipalities of Kaski District
Dhampus beautiful village

Populated places in Kaski District